Aubrey De Vere may refer to:

 Aubrey de Vere I (died c. 1112/13), tenant-in-chief in England of William the Conqueror in 1086
 Aubrey de Vere II (c. 1085–1141), master chamberlain of England
 Aubrey de Vere, 1st Earl of Oxford (c. 1115–1194)
 Aubrey de Vere, 2nd Earl of Oxford (c. 1163–1214)
 Aubrey de Vere, 10th Earl of Oxford (c. 1338–1400)
 Sir Aubrey de Vere, 2nd Baronet (1788–1846), poet, of the De Vere baronets
 Aubrey Thomas de Vere (1814–1902), Irish poet, son of the preceding
 Aubrey de Vere, 20th Earl of Oxford (1627–1703), Royalist during the English Civil War